Aesculus flava, the yellow buckeye, common buckeye, or sweet buckeye, is a species of deciduous tree. It is native to the Ohio Valley and Appalachian Mountains of the Eastern United States. It grows in mesophytic forest or floodplains, generally in acid to circumneutral soil, reaching a height of 20m to 48m (65 ft to 154 ft).

Description
The leaves are palmately compound with five (rarely seven) leaflets, 10–25 cm long and broad. The flowers are produced in panicles in spring, yellow to yellow-green, each flower 2–3 cm long with the stamens shorter than the petals (unlike the related A. glabra (Ohio buckeye), where the stamens are longer than the petals). The twigs have a faintly rank odor, but much less so than the Ohio buckeye, A. glabra. The fruit is a smooth (spineless), round or oblong capsule 5–7 cm diameter, containing 1-3 nut-like seeds, 2.5-3.5 cm diameter, brown with a whitish basal scar.  The fruit is poisonous to humans but can be made edible through a leaching process.

Cultivation
Aesculus flava is cultivated as an ornamental tree. The tree's showy yellow flowers and good autumn color are attractive in larger gardens and in parks.

This plant has gained the Royal Horticultural Society's Award of Garden Merit.

It has been marked as a pollinator plant that attracts hummingbirds and bees.

Uses
Native Americans roasted and soaked the poisonous seeds to remove the toxic element and consume them as food.

Photo gallery

References

External links

Yellow Buckeye Diagnostic images, Morton Arboretum acc. 12-U*1
Bioimages.vanderbilt.edu — Aesculus flava photo gallery
Ohio Buckeye Trivia Cards tell about the buckeye, buckeye tree, buckeye history, buckeye folklore and more.

flava
Flora of the Appalachian Mountains
Trees of the Eastern United States
Trees of the Southeastern United States
Trees of the Northeastern United States
Natural history of the Great Smoky Mountains
Garden plants of North America
Ornamental trees
Trees of the Great Lakes region (North America)